The Aerocraft 2AS is a tandem-seat training aircraft developed from the Kinner Sportwing.

Design and development
Timm formed the Wally Timm Company in Glendale, California. He purchased the rights to the Kinner Sportwing, a side-by-side monoplane training aircraft and modified it as a tandem-seat trainer to compete for the Civilian Pilot Training Program build-up prior to World War II. The prototype received ATC# 733 on January 1, 1941. The Timm Aerocraft 2AS lost out to a Fairchild design. The design was sold to Aetna Aircraft, with only six examples produced.

The Aerocraft is a conventional landing gear equipped, strut-braced, low-winged monoplane with open cockpit tandem seating and a Kinner R-5 radial engine. The fuselage is welded steel tubing with aircraft fabric covering. The wing uses wooden spars and ribs with fabric covering.

Operational history
The prototype aircraft was test flown by longtime Timm associate Frank Clarke in 1941.

An Aetna 2AS won the Antique Champion award at the 1985 EAA Airshow at Oshkosh, Wisconsin.

The sole surviving Timm 2AS, the fourth to be built, is preserved in an airworthy condition at the Iowa Aviation Museum and Hall of Fame located at Greenfield, Iowa.

Specifications (Timm Aerocraft 2AS)

See also

References

Notes

Bibliography

 Juptner, Joseph P. U.S. Civil Aircraft Series, Volume 8. New York: McGraw-Hill Professional, 1993. .
 Ogden, Bob. Aviation Museums and Collections of North America. Air-Britain (Historians) Ltd. 2007. Tonbridge, Kent. .
 Underwood, John. Grand Central Air Terminal. Mount Pleasant, South Carolina: Arcadia Publishing, 2006. .

1930s United States military trainer aircraft
Aerocraft 2AS